The Alto Orinoco Municipality  is one of the seven municipalities (municipios) that make up the southern Venezuelan state of Amazonas and, according to the 2011 census by the National Institute of Statistics of Venezuela, the municipality has a population of 12,687. The town of La Esmeralda is the shire town of the Alto Orinoco.

History

After the dissolution of the Spanish Commission of Territorial Limits by order of the Crown in 1760, Iturriaga and Solano returned to Spain and presented to the Court a series of proposals to ensure Spanish control over their possessions of Orinoco and Río Negro. Out of these proposals came the decision to create separate commands.  On March 17, 1767, Diez de la Fuente arrived in Esmeralda accompanied by 60 Spaniards and the caciques Wadena and Wasaha, who led a group of 3,000 natives.  With this, the redevelopment of Esmeralda commenced.

The municipality is recognized as a territorial division by the government of Antonio Guzmán Blanco on December 10, 1880, of what is now the Amazonas State.

Demographics
The Alto Orinoco Municipality, according to a 2007 population estimate by the National Institute of Statistics of Venezuela, has a population of 17,797 (up from 15,281 in 2000). This amounts to 12.5% of the state's population.

Government
The mayor of the Alto Orinoco Municipality is Jaime Turon, re-elected on October 31, 2004, with 40% of the vote.  The municipality is divided into five parishes: Capital Alto Orinoco, Huachamacare, Marawaka, Mavaca, and Sierra Parima. Prior to December 18, 1997, Alto Orinoco Municipality had only one parish.

References

External links
altoorinoco-amazonas.gov.ve 

Municipalities of Amazonas (Venezuelan state)